Antonio Espejo (born 5 April 1968) is a Spanish former racing cyclist. He rode in the 1990 Tour de France.

References

External links
 

1968 births
Living people
Spanish male cyclists
Sportspeople from the Province of Córdoba (Spain)
Cyclists from Andalusia
People from Campiña Sur (Córdoba)